Cooperstown-Westville Airport  is a privately owned, public-use airport located four nautical miles (7 km) southeast of the central business district of Cooperstown, in Otsego County, New York, United States. The airport's FAA airport code was originally NY54, and was changed to K23 in the early 2000s.

This article does not refer to the Cooperstown airport with two paved strips 1.5 miles northwest of Cooperstown proper that closed in the 1960s.

Facilities and aircraft 
It has one runway designated 2/20 with a 2,337 by 125 ft (712 x 38 m) turf surface. 

For the 12-month period ending February 23, 2008, the airport had 11,470 aircraft operations, an average of 31 per day: 98% general aviation and 2% military. At that time there were 22 aircraft based at this airport: 95% single-engine and 5% multi-engine.

References

External links 
 

Airports in New York (state)